Middle watch or The Middle Watch may refer to:

 The middle watch (or midwatch), one of the regular periods of work duty under a watch system; see Watch system#Traditional system
 The Middle Watch (play), a play by Ian Hay
 The Middle Watch (1930 film)
 The Middle Watch (1940 film)